The Coordination of Azawad Movements (CMA) is a coalition of Tuareg independence and Arab nationalist groups which formed in Mali during the Northern Mali conflict in 2014., While presiding over the CMA, Sidi Brahim Ould Sidatt was assassinated in Bamako on April 13, 2021.

Organization

The CMA is currently chaired by Bilal Ag Acherif as of March 2017.

Participants
 The National Movement for the Liberation of Azawad (MNLA)
 The High Council for Unity of Azawad (HCUA)
 The Arab Movement of Azawad (MAA)
 The Coordination of Patriotic Resistance Movements and Forces (CMFPR)
 The Coalition for the People of Azawad (CPA)

See also
Azawad
Tuareg rebellions

References

2014 establishments in Mali
History of Azawad
Political movements in Mali
Tuareg independence movement